Fan Zeng (277–204 BC) was an adviser to the warlord Xiang Yu, who fought for supremacy with Liu Bang (Emperor Gao), the founder of the Han dynasty, during the Chu–Han Contention (206–202 BC).

Life
Fan Zeng was from Juchao (present-day Yafu Street, Juchao District, Chaohu City, Anhui). He had a keen interest in military strategy and politics. In 207 BC, when Fan Zeng was about 70, he left home to meet Xiang Liang, who had rebelled against the Qin dynasty, and was accepted by Xiang Liang as an advisor.

After Xiang Liang died, Fan Zeng continued serving his nephew, Xiang Yu, as an advisor. Xiang Yu respectfully addressed Fan Zeng as his "Second Father" (亞父; Yafu). Since then, Fan Zeng had been planning and formulating strategies for Xiang Yu to overcome his rivals. In 206 BC, Fan Zeng followed Xiang Yu as their army entered Guanzhong (heartland of the Qin dynasty), where Fan Zeng noticed that Liu Bang would become a future threat to Xiang Yu. Fan Zeng constantly urged Xiang Yu to kill Liu Bang then, but Xiang did not heed his advice.

During the Feast at Hong Gate, Fan Zeng ordered Xiang Yu's cousin Xiang Zhuang to pretend to perform a sword dance and use the opportunity to kill Liu Bang, who was present at the feast on Xiang Yu's invitation. However, Xiang Yu listened to his uncle Xiang Bo, a close friend of Liu Bang's strategist Zhang Liang, and spared Liu's life. Liu Bang lied that he was going to the latrine and seized the chance to escape. The furious Fan Zeng exclaimed,

In 204 BC, when Liu Bang was besieged by Xiang Yu at the Battle of Xingyang, he requested for an armistice. Xiang Yu agreed but Fan Zeng strongly opposed his decision, telling him that he would regret if he agreed to the armistice. Xiang Yu listened to Fan Zeng and continued attacking Liu Bang. Liu Bang's strategist Chen Ping used a scheme to trick Xiang Yu into believing that Fan Zeng had the intention of betraying him. Xiang Yu fell for the ruse and dismissed Fan Zeng. Fan Zeng made up his mind to leave Xiang Yu. Before leaving, he said,

Fan Zeng died of illness on his journey home and was buried by Xiang Yu's followers in Pengcheng (彭城; present-day Xuzhou, Jiangsu). His tomb is still in existence today. Despite this, there were legends that he had become a hermit around the modern day Tiantai County. After Xiang Yu's death, Liu Bang remarked that it was a pity that Xiang had a capable Fan Zeng to help him, but he did not use Fan well.

References

 Sima, Qian. Records of the Grand Historian (Shiji).

270s BC births
204 BC deaths
Chu–Han contention people